Speigle House is a historic home located at Palmyra, Marion County, Missouri.  It was built about 1850, and is a two-story, transitional vernacular Greek Revival / Italianate style brick dwelling. It has a two-story rear ell off the main block and hipped roof with bracketed cornice.

It was added to the National Register of Historic Places in 1985.

References

Houses on the National Register of Historic Places in Missouri
Greek Revival houses in Missouri
Italianate architecture in Missouri
Houses completed in 1850
Buildings and structures in Marion County, Missouri
National Register of Historic Places in Marion County, Missouri